Kerry Schall (born August 9, 1971) is a retired American mixed martial arts fighter. His nickname "Meat Truck" is for his huge size and punching power.

Background
The Kankakee, Illinois native was a football and wrestling star at Herscher High School outside of Chicago, where he then went on to graduate from the University of Cincinnati with a degree in electrical engineering.

MMA career and The Ultimate Fighter
Schall has fought for many MMA organizations such as the UFC, Fighting Network Rings, and Extreme Challenge. He was on The Ultimate Fighter 2 where he was eliminated on episode 1 due to an injury. He was invited to fight for the UFC at The Ultimate Fighter 2 Finale where he would lose to Keith Jardine by TKO in the 2nd round.
 
Schall faced Paul Buentello at Nemesis Fighting: MMA Global Invasion on December 10, 2010  He lost the fight via unanimous decision.

Schall would return after a long hiatus against Satoshi Ishii at IGF: GENOME 25 on March 20, 2013. Schall lost the bout via submission in the first round.

Personal life
Schall is married to Amanda Vandeberg RN and he has twin children Andrew and Lauren. He is also stepfather to Jordan, Madison and Koa, Vandeberg's children from her previous marriage to Matt Anoaʻi.

Mixed martial arts record

|-
| Loss
| align=center| 23–13 (1)
| Satoshi Ishii
| Submission (armbar)
| IGF: GENOME 25
| 
| align=center| 1
| align=center| 2:43
| Fukuoka, Japan
| 
|-
| Loss
| align=center| 23–12 (1)
| Paul Buentello
| Decision (unanimous)
| Nemesis Fighting: MMA Global Invasion
| 
| align=center| 3
| align=center| 5:00
| Punta Cana, Punta Cana, La Altagracia, Dominican Republic
| 
|-
| Win
| align=center| 23–11 (1)
| Justin Gizzard
| DQ
| Extreme Challenge 111
| 
| align=center| 1
| align=center| 3:36
| Indiana, United States
| 
|-
| Loss
| align=center| 22–11 (1)
| Dave Herman
| TKO (knees and punches)
| ShoXC: Elite Challenger Series
| 
| align=center| 1
| align=center| 1:06
| Indiana, United States
| 
|-
| Loss
| align=center| 22–10 (1)
| Antoine Hayes
| Decision (unanimous)
| Adrenaline MMA 1
| 
| align=center| 3
| align=center| 5:00
| Illinois, United States
| 
|-
| Loss
| align=center| 22–9 (1)
| Shane Ott
| TKO (injury)
| Extreme Challenge 77
| 
| align=center| 1
| align=center| 1:23
| Ohio, United States
| 
|-
| Win
| align=center| 22–8 (1)
| Nathan Kirby
| DQ
| Extreme Challenge 74
| 
| align=center| N/A
| align=center| N/A
| Iowa, United States
| 
|-
| Win
| align=center| 21–8 (1)
| Geza Kalman
| Submission (guillotine choke)
| XFO 13: Operation Beatdown
| 
| align=center| 1
| align=center| 0:25
| Illinois, United States
| 
|-
| NC
| align=center| 20–8 (1)
| Mario Rinaldi
| No Contest (fighters fell from ring)
| Absolute Fighting Championships 16
| 
| align=center| 1
| align=center| N/A
| Florida, United States
| 
|-
| Win
| align=center| 20–8
| Eldred Nunn
| Submission (rear-naked choke)
| XFO 10: Explosion
| 
| align=center| 1
| align=center| 1:31
| Illinois, United States
| 
|-
| Loss
| align=center| 19–8
| Keith Jardine
| TKO (leg kicks)
| The Ultimate Fighter 2 Finale
| 
| align=center| 2
| align=center| 3:28
| Nevada, United States
| 
|-
| Win
| align=center| 19–7
| Ulysses Castro
| DQ (low blows)
| Euphoria: Road to the Titles
| 
| align=center| 2
| align=center| 0:20
| New Jersey, United States
| 
|-
| Loss
| align=center| 18–7
| Kevin Jordan
| Submission (rear-naked choke)
| XFO 2: New Blood
| 
| align=center| 1
| align=center| 2:06
| Wisconsin, United States
| 
|-
| Win
| align=center| 18–6
| Chris Herring
| TKO (submission to punch)
| ICE 9
| 
| align=center| 1
| align=center| 0:51
| Ohio, United States
| Herring couldn't continue after Schall landed a punch directly to the eyeball.
|-
| Win
| align=center| 17–6
| Ray Seraille
| KO (punch)
| SuperBrawl 35
| 
| align=center| 1
| align=center| 2:15
| Hawaii, United States
| 
|-
| Win
| align=center| 16–6
| Jimmy Sullivan
| TKO (submission to strikes)
| Extreme Challenge 56
| 
| align=center| 1
| align=center| 1:08
| Minnesota, United States
| 
|-
| Win
| align=center| 15–6
| Demian Decorah
| Decision (split)
| Extreme Challenge 54
| 
| align=center| 3
| align=center| 3:00
| Illinois, United States
| 
|-
| Loss
| align=center| 14–6
| Greg Wikan
| TKO (knee injury)
| ICC 1: Retribution
| 
| align=center| 1
| align=center| 3:35
| Minnesota, United States
| 
|-
| Win
| align=center| 14–5
| John Clausen
| Submission (guillotine choke)
| UW: Godsey vs Wiuff
| 
| align=center| 1
| align=center| 0:30
| Minnesota, United States
| 
|-
| Win
| align=center| 13–5
| Kekumu Cambra
| Submission (heel hook)
| UCC Hawaii: Eruption in Hawaii
| 
| align=center| 1
| align=center| 2:48
| Hawaii, United States
| 
|-
| Win
| align=center| 12–5
| Steve Friedrichs
| Submission (heel hook)
| UAGF 2: Ultimate Cage Fighting 2
| 
| align=center| 2
| align=center| 0:56
| California, United States
| 
|-
| Win
| align=center| 11–5
| Mark Smith
| Submission (guillotine choke)
| RFC 1: The Beginning
| 
| align=center| 1
| align=center| 3:46
| Nevada, United States
| 
|-
| Loss
| align=center| 10–5
| Ben Rothwell
| TKO (neck injury)
| SB 24: Return of the Heavyweights 2
| 
| align=center| 2
| align=center| 2:10
| Hawaii, United States
| 
|-
| Loss
| align=center| 10–4
| Ben Rothwell
| Submission (broken foot)
| Extreme Challenge 46
| 
| align=center| 1
| align=center| 7:29
| Iowa, United States
|Extreme Challenge Heavyweight Tournament Final.
|-
| Win
| align=center| 10–3
| William Hill
| Submission (rear-naked choke)
| Extreme Challenge 46
| 
| align=center| 1
| align=center| 1:23
| Iowa, United States
| 
|-
| Win
| align=center| 9–3
| Joe Campanella
| Submission (armbar)
| Extreme Fights 2
| 
| align=center| 1
| align=center| 0:30
| Ohio, United States
| 
|-
| Win
| align=center| 8–3
| Brian Ebersole
| Submission (kneebar)
| UW: Battle for the Belts
| 
| align=center| 1
| align=center| N/A
| Minnesota, United States
| 
|-
| Win
| align=center| 7–3
| Rob Smith
| Submission (rear-naked choke)
| UW: Battle for the Belts
| 
| align=center| 1
| align=center| N/A
| Minnesota, United States
| 
|-
| Win
| align=center| 6–3
| Lenn Walker
| TKO (submission to punches)
| Extreme Fights 1
| 
| align=center| 1
| align=center| 0:33
| Ohio, United States
| 
|-
| Loss
| align=center| 5–3
| Fedor Emelianenko
| Submission (armbar)
| RINGS: World Title Series 1
| 
| align=center| 1
| align=center| 1:47
| Tokyo, Japan
| 
|-
| Win
| align=center| 5–2
| John Dixon
| Submission (armlock)
| RINGS USA: Battle of Champions
| 
| align=center| 1
| align=center| 1:19
| Iowa, United States
| 
|-
| Loss
| align=center| 4–2
| Travis Fulton
| TKO (corner stoppage)
| ETFN: Extreme Tuesday Night Fights
| 
| align=center| 1
| align=center| 6:56
| Indiana, United States
| 
|-
| Loss
| align=center| 4–1
| Bobby Hoffman
| Decision (unanimous)
| WEF 9: World Class
| 
| align=center| 4
| align=center| 3:00
| Indiana, United States
| 
|-
| Win
| align=center| 4–0
| JT Corley
| TKO (submission to knees)
| World Extreme Fighting 6
| 
| align=center| 1
| align=center| N/A
| Wheeling, West Virginia, United States
| 
|-
| Win
| align=center| 3–0
| Wade Hamilton
| TKO (submission to knees)
| Extreme Challenge 23
| 
| align=center| 1
| align=center| 0:34
| Indiana, United States
| 
|-
| Win
| align=center| 2–0
| Eddie Moore
| Submission (front choke)
| Extreme Combat Challenge
| 
| align=center| 1
| align=center| 0:32
| Indiana, United States
| 
|-
| Win
| align=center| 1–0
| Ken Dodson
| TKO (punches)
| Extreme Combat Challenge
| 
| align=center| 1
| align=center| 0:14
| Indiana, United States
|

References

External links
 
 
 

Living people
1971 births
American male mixed martial artists
Heavyweight mixed martial artists
Mixed martial artists utilizing wrestling
Sportspeople from Cincinnati
Mixed martial artists from Ohio